Henry Newman (1845 – July 13, 1915) was a German-born soldier in the U.S. Army who served with the 5th U.S. Cavalry during the Indian Wars. In the Apache Wars, he was one of three men who received the Medal of Honor for gallantry against a hostile band of Apache Indians in the Whetstone Mountains of Arizona on July 13, 1872.

Biography
Henry Newman was born in Germany in 1845. He later emigrated to the United States and enlisted in the U.S. Army in Cincinnati, Ohio. Assigned to frontier duty with the 5th U.S. Cavalry, he took part in the Apache Wars during the early 1870s and eventually rose to the rank of first sergeant. 

On July 13, 1872, Newman set off from Camp Crittenden with a small cavalry detachment under the command of Second Lieutenant William P. Hall to pursue an Apache raiding party that had stolen cattle from a local Mexican rancher. They pursued the Apaches fifteen miles into a canyon in the Whetstone Mountains and encountered a much larger force then they had expected. Though they attempted to surprise the Apache, the troopers were spotted and the hostiles charged. The Apache also began dropping boulders from as high as 800 feet, injuring several cavalrymen and their horses. Outnumbered and unable to mount a successful defence as long as the Apache were concealed in the canyon, Hall ordered a retreat. As second-in-command, Newman volunteered to stay behind with Hall and Private Michael Glynn to cover the retreat so the wounded could be taken to safety. 

For his actions, Newman received the Medal of Honor for gallantry, along with Privates Glynn and John Nihill, on December 4, 1874. He died in Baltimore, Maryland on July 13, 1915, and was buried in Loudon Park National Cemetery.

Medal of Honor citation
Rank and organization: First Sergeant, Company F, 5th U.S. Cavalry. Place and date: At Whetstone Mountains, Ariz., 13 July 1872. Entered service at: ------. Birth: Germany. Date of issue: 4 December 1874.

Citation:

He and 2 companions covered the withdrawal of wounded comrades from the fire of an Apache band well concealed among rocks.

See also

List of Medal of Honor recipients for the Indian Wars

References

Further reading
Anderson, Harry H., ed. Indian Campaigns: Sketches of Cavalry Service in Arizona and on the Northern Plains. Collins, Colorado: Old Army Press, 1984. 
Konstantin, Phil. This Day in North American Indian History: Important Dates in the History of North America's Native Peoples for Every Calendar Day. New York: Da Capo Press, 2002.

External links

1845 births
1915 deaths
American military personnel of the Indian Wars
United States Army Medal of Honor recipients
Military personnel from Baltimore
United States Army soldiers
German-born Medal of Honor recipients
German emigrants to the United States
American Indian Wars recipients of the Medal of Honor